Ray Cochrane (born 18 June 1957 in Banbridge, County Down, Northern Ireland) is a retired Northern Irish horse racing jockey and current sports agent.

Cochrane was the winning jockey in three of the five British Classic Races: the 1000 Guineas Stakes and Epsom Oaks on Midway Lady, trained by Ben Hanbury in 1986, and the Epsom Derby on Kahyasi for his retained stable of Luca Cumani in 1988. Cochrane was also second in the 2000 Guineas Stakes on Chief Singer in 1984 and won the Group 1 July Cup at Newmarket and Sussex Stakes at Goodwood on the same horse. Cochrane received a Flat Jockey Special Recognition Lester Award in 2000.

Cochrane received the Queen's Commendation for Bravery in 2002 for saving the life of fellow jockey Frankie Dettori following a plane crash in 2000. Cochrane subsequently became Dettori's agent, a role he fulfilled until 2020.

Major wins
 Great Britain
 1000 Guineas Stakes - Midway Lady (1986)
 Champion Stakes - Legal Case (1989)
 Coronation Cup - Sheriff's Star (1989)
 Derby Stakes - Kahyasi (1988)
 Diamond Jubilee Stakes - Polish Patriot (1991)
 July Cup - (2) - Chief Singer (1984), Polish Patriot (1991)
 Lockinge Stakes - (2) - Then Again (1987), Selkirk (1992)
 Middle Park Stakes - Mister Majestic (1986)
 Oaks Stakes - Midway Lady (1986)
 Queen Anne Stakes - Then Again (1987)
 Queen Elizabeth II Stakes - Selkirk (1991)
 St. James's Palace Stakes - (2) - Chief Singer (1984), Half a Year (1987)
 Sun Chariot Stakes - Infamy (1987)
 Sussex Stakes - Chief Singer (1984)
 Yorkshire Oaks - Only Royale (1993)

 Ireland
 Irish 1,000 Guineas - Ensconse (1989)
 Irish Derby - Kahyasi (1988)
 Phoenix Stakes - (2) - Roaring Riva (1985), Pharaoh's Delight (1989)

 France
 Poule d'Essai des Pouliches - Valentine Waltz (1999)
 Prix de l'Abbaye de Longchamp - My Best Valentine (1998)

 Italy
 Premio Presidente della Repubblica - Artan (1997)

See also
List of jockeys

References

1957 births
Living people
Lester Award winners
Survivors of aviation accidents or incidents
Sportspeople from County Down
Jockeys from Northern Ireland
Recipients of the Queen's Commendation for Bravery